Varsha Varman (born 1 June 1994) is a professional Indian sport shooter. She won the bronze medal at the 2014 Asian Games at Incheon in the women's double trap team event, along with Shagun Chowdhary and Shreyasi Singh. Varman thus became the first sportsperson from Bhopal Madhya Pradesh to win a medal at the Asian Games. She is a prodigy. She is the only athlete from her state to have represented India at the Commonwealth Games.

Varsha studied at St. Joseph's Co-ed School, Bhopal. Varsha also ranked #1 in the Ajmer region of the Central Board of Secondary Education examinations in Class XII, and 4th in the entire country with 97.2%. She has been awarded the prestigious Eklvaya Award  in 2013 and the Vikram Award  in 2015 for her meritorious performances.

Education 
She had earlier pursued a law degree at the University of Warwick in UK, but moved to Harvard to be able to focus more on shooting. She is currently studying economics at Harvard University in the United States.

References

External links
 Gunning medals in Italy
 Athlete Profile at Incheon 2014
 

Living people
1994 births
Indian female sport shooters
Asian Games medalists in shooting
Shooters at the 2014 Asian Games
Sportswomen from Madhya Pradesh
Sportspeople from Bhopal
21st-century Indian women
21st-century Indian people
Sport shooters from Madhya Pradesh
Asian Games bronze medalists for India
Medalists at the 2014 Asian Games
Shooters at the 2018 Asian Games
Harvard College alumni